Esther Rose is an American country musician based in New Orleans, Louisiana, United States.

History
Esther Rose began her career collaborating with musician Luke Winslow-King, to whom she was married from 2013 to 2015. In 2017, Rose released her debut album titled This Time Last Night. In 2019, Rose signed to Father/Daughter Records and released her second album titled You Made It This Far. On March 26, 2021, Rose released her third album How Many Times. Rose's fourth album, Safe to Run, will be released on April 21, 2023 via New West Records.

Discography

Studio albums 
This Time Last Night (2017, Mashed Potato)
You Made It This Far (2019, Father/Daughter)
How Many Times (2021, Father/Daughter)

References

Year of birth missing (living people)
Living people
American women country singers
Country musicians from Louisiana
Musicians from New Orleans
21st-century American women singers
21st-century American singers